WLPZ-LP (95.1 FM) is a community radio station licensed to Leominster, Massachusetts and serves the Leominster area.  Its broadcast license is held by the City of Leominster and is operated by a staff of all volunteers and broadcasts 24 hours a day 7 days a week.  The day-to-day operation of the station is overseen by the station manager Sonny Levine, a resident of the City of Leominster and volunteer. The station also has a Program Director, Scott Cloutier,  Administrative Assistant, Denise Sutton, Sales and Marketing Director, Carol Levine and Community Relations Mary Ellen Kelley. WLPZ's studios are located in the city's Gallagher Building, its transmitter is located off Sunrise Avenue.

History
This station received its original construction permit from the Federal Communications Commission on January 31, 2014. The new station was assigned the WLPZ-LP call sign by the FCC on March 11, 2016.  The station received its license to cover from the FCC on January 26, 2017; it signed on the same day with a 45-minute test broadcast hosted by Leominster mayor Dean Mazzarella. WLPZ-LP's community radio format was described by Mazzarella as "information, fun and entertainment in the community;" emergency information is also broadcast by the station.

References

External links

LPZ-LP
Radio stations established in 2017
LPZ-LP
2017 establishments in Massachusetts
Community radio stations in the United States